Charles Alan Smythies (6 August 18447 May 1894) was a British colonial bishop in the 19th century.

Life
Smythies was born in Colchester, the son of the Rev. Charles Norfolk Smythies, vicar of St-Mary-at-the-Walls there, and his wife Isabella Travers, daughter of Eaton Travers RN. He was educated at Felsted School and Trinity College, Cambridge, and ordained in 1869. His first post was a curacy in Great Marlow, after which he was Vicar of Roath in Cardiff.

Smythies was the fourth Bishop of the Universities' Mission to Central Africa, and was consecrated on 30 November 1883, serving as Bishop in Central Africa until that diocese was split (by his initiative) in 1892, and then of one of the parts, Zanzibar, until his death.

Notes

External links
The Life of Charles Alan Smythies

1844 births
People from Colchester
Alumni of Trinity College, Cambridge
English Anglican missionaries
19th-century Anglican bishops in Africa
1894 deaths
Anglican missionaries in Tanzania
Anglican missionaries in Malawi
Anglican bishops in Central Africa
Anglican bishops of Zanzibar